Uçar v surname. Notable people with the surname include:

 Ahmet Uçar, Turkish academic
 Alper Uçar, Turkish figure skater
 Feyyaz Uçar, Turkish footballer
 Turgut Uçar, Turkish football manager
 Uğur Uçar, Turkish footballer
 Ümmühan Uçar, Turkish female weightlifter
 Ömer Uçar, Turkish Actor

Turkish-language surnames